{{DISPLAYTITLE:C18H24O}}
The molecular formula C18H24O (molar mass: 256.39 g/mol, exact mass: 256.1827 u) may refer to:

 Bakuchiol
 Drupanol